Rio Rico is an unincorporated community and census-designated place (CDP) in Santa Cruz County, Arizona, United States. The population was 18,962 at the 2010 census. The Rio Rico CDP replaced the former CDP's of Rio Rico Northwest, Rio Rico Northeast, Rio Rico Southwest, and Rio Rico Southeast.

Geography
Rio Rico is located in Santa Cruz County, north of Nogales at the confluence of Sonoita Creek and the Santa Cruz River.

According to the United States Census Bureau, the community has a total area of 62.3 square miles (161.2 km), all  land.

Demographics

As of the census of 2010, there were 18,962 people living in the community, making it Santa Cruz County's second-largest community after its historic population center and county seat, Nogales. The racial makeup of the community was 85.3% Hispanic or Latino, 0.4% Black or African American, 0.6% Native American, 0.5% Asian, 0.1% Pacific Islander, and 1.8% from two or more races. Approximately 11.4% of the population is non-Hispanic white.

See also

 List of census-designated places in Arizona

References

External links

Census-designated places in Santa Cruz County, Arizona